Chase Brooks is a head coach and a former soccer player. He holds a USSF "B" License

Player
Brooks played college soccer for the Eckerd Tritons from the 1999–00 season to the 2002–03 season. He served as captain during his last two seasons, and was three-times Sunshine State Conference Honor Roll athlete and a First-Team All-Sunshine Conference player his senior year.

Coach
Brooks coached the Eckerd Tritons from May 2003 until May 2004.

In 2011, he was hired as head coach for the Niagara Purple Eagles men's soccer team.

In 2013, he was hired by the Duquesne Dukes.

References

External links
 Duquesne profile

Year of birth missing (living people)
Living people
American soccer coaches
Dayton Flyers men's soccer coaches
Duquesne Dukes men's soccer coaches
Eckerd Tritons men's soccer coaches
Eckerd Tritons men's soccer players
Northern Illinois Huskies men's soccer coaches
Niagara Purple Eagles men's soccer coaches
Sportspeople from Fort Myers, Florida
Soccer players from Florida
Association footballers not categorized by position
Association football players not categorized by nationality